The following article lists the many former ships of the Indonesian Navy that are no longer in service. Older ships may use the old prefix "RI" instead of the current "KRI" prefix. Note: some of the classes use the 'Indonesian Designation' from SIPRI.

Submarine Fleet

Surface Fleet

Amphibious Forces

Support Ship

References

Bibliography

Indonesia